Robert Rosen is an American writer born in Brooklyn, New York, on July 27, 1952. He is the author of Nowhere Man: The Final Days of John Lennon, a controversial account of the ex-Beatle's last five years, based on Rosen’s memory of Lennon’s diaries.

His second book, Beaver Street: A History of Modern Pornography, was published by Headpress in the U.K. in 2011 and in the U.S. in 2012. The Erotic Review said of the book, "Beaver Street captures the aroma of pornography, bottles it, and gives it so much class you could put it up there with Dior or Chanel."

A memoir, Bobby in Naziland: A Tale of Flatbush, was published by Headpress in 2019. The Jewish Voice said that the book portrays Flatbush "with the characterizations and insight of a good novel.... But it really is the neighborhood that's the star of the story. You don’t have to be Jewish—or a Brooklynite—to be enchanted by this book."
The book was re-released in 2022 as A Brooklyn Memoir: My Life as a Boy.

Career

He attended the City College of New York. While there he edited Observation Post (OP), one of the student newspapers.

Lennon Diary Controversy
John Lennon's diaries were given to Rosen in 1981 by Frederic Seaman, Lennon's personal assistant. Seaman and Rosen were old friends from working at the OP in college. According to Rosen, Seaman told Rosen that Lennon had given him permission to use the diaries as source material for a biography that Seaman was to write in the event of Lennon's death. Five days after Lennon's murder, Seaman asked Rosen to help him with the project.

According to Rosen's testimony at Seaman's copyright infringement trial in September 2002, Seaman sent Rosen out of town in February 1982 and then ransacked his apartment, taking everything Rosen had been working on, including Lennon’s diaries, photocopies of the diaries, transcripts of the diaries, and a rough draft of the manuscript.

Nowhere Man
In his book Nowhere Man: The Final Days of John Lennon, Rosen states that he recreated from memory portions of Lennon’s diaries and combined this information with details from his own diaries about what had happened since Lennon and Yoko Ono hired Seaman in February 1979. A version of the manuscript was completed in 1982. An expanded version was published 18 years later.

Footnotes

External links
 Robert Rosen's official website
 Rosen's personal blog

Interviews
 Interview with Robert Rosen on Lennon fansite
Interview on Lennon Fansite
 Interview with Robert Rosen in English and Spanish, Part One
 Nowhere Man excerpt and “A Conversation with Robert Rosen” from Vision Magazine

1952 births
Living people
Erasmus Hall High School alumni
American male writers